Don Mot Daeng is a district (amphoe) in the central part of Ubon Ratchathani province, northeastern Thailand. The district is named after the island Don Mot Daeng in the Mun River.

History
The area of the district was split off from Mueang Ubon Ratchathani district and formed a minor district (king amphoe) on 1 April 1991. It was upgraded to a full district on 5 December 1996.

The name Don Mot Daeng meaning "upland of red ant".

Geography
Neighboring districts are (from the east clockwise) Tan Sum, Sawang Wirawong, Mueang Ubon Ratchathani, Lao Suea Kok and Trakan Phuet Phon of Ubon Ratchathani Province.

The important water resources are the Mun and Se Bok River.

Administration
The district is divided into four sub-districts (tambons), which are further subdivided into 46 villages (mubans). There are no municipal (thesaban) areas, and four tambon administrative organizations (TAO).

References

External links
amphoe.com

Don Mot Daeng